Anne Janssen (born 31 August 1982 in Jever) is a German politician for the CDU and since 2021 member of the Bundestag. She entered the parliament in 6th place on the state list of the CDU Lower Saxony.

Life
Janssen was born 1982 in the West German town of Jever and grew up in neighboring Wittmund. After graduating from high school, she trained as a nurse at Wittmund Hospital. She then worked in the hospital and in outpatient care before studying to become a teacher in Oldenburg. Following her graduation, she worked as a primary school teacher at the Finkenburg School in Wittmund. Janssen is married and has three children. She is of the Lutheran denomination.

MP
Janssen was elected to the Bundestag in 2021. In the Bundestag, Janssen is a full member of the Family Affairs Committee. In addition, she is a deputy member of the Health Committee, as well as the Committee on Tourism.

References

External links
 Biography at the German Bundestag
 Website of Anne Janssen

Living people
1982 births
Christian Democratic Union of Germany politicians
Members of the Bundestag 2021–2025
21st-century German politicians
21st-century German women politicians
Female members of the Bundestag